Emilia Ortiz Pérez (Tepic, 1917 – Tepic, November 24, 2012) was a Mexican painter, cartoonist, caricaturist, and poet, best known for her watercolors. Her father, Abraham D. Ortiz, had arrived at Tepic originally from Oaxaca where he married Elvira Perez and engaged in haberdashery and the hardware trade. She studied painting at the Academy of San Carlos in Mexico City. Her drawings and paintings were exhibited in 1940. An author as well, her prizewinning book, De mis soledades vengo, was published in 1986. The Museo Emilia Ortiz in Lerdo houses Ortiz's photography and art, as well as local art.

Gallery

References

Sources
Elisa García Barragán (1995). EMILIA ORTIZ Vida y Obra de una pintora apasionada. FUNDACIÓN ALICA DE NAYARIT, A.C.. .

1917 births
2012 deaths
People from Tepic
Mexican women painters
Mexican watercolourists
Mexican cartoonists
Mexican women cartoonists
Mexican caricaturists
Mexican women poets
20th-century Mexican poets
20th-century Mexican women writers
Women watercolorists